Centerpoint High School is an accredited public high school serving students in grades six through twelve in the rural community of Rosboro, Arkansas, United States.

History 
In 1995, the Glenwood School District in Glenwood, Arkansas, voluntarily consolidated with the nearby Amity School District in Amity, Arkansas. Construction began shortly thereafter on a new high school located at Rosboro. The new Centerpoint High School opened in August 1997 with Donis Smead serving as the first principal.

Academics 
Centerpoint High School is accredited by the Arkansas Department of Education (ADE). Students are required to complete at least 24 credits in order to graduate. There are four pathways that lead to a high school diploma. Those pathways include general curriculum, Honors and Advanced Placement (AP), Project 2020, and CAAST.
 
Project 2020
In 2017, a partnership was formed with Cossatot Community College of the University of Arkansas in De Queen, Arkansas, that allowed qualified students to concurrently enroll in both Cossatot and Centerpoint High School. As a result, students graduate with two associate degrees at the same time they graduate with their high school diploma.
 
CAAST
In August 2020, the Centerpoint Academy of Agriculture and Skilled Trades (CAAST) opened as a conversion charter school for students in grades 11–12. Funded by a $1.25 million grant from the Arkansas Public School Resource Center, CAAST is the only agricultural high school in the state of Arkansas.

Knight-Reddie ScholarshipStudents who graduate with honors from Centerpoint High School may choose to attend college at Henderson State University without paying tuition or fees.

Co-curricular activities 
The Knights sports teams include football, golf (boys/girls), basketball (boys/girls), baseball, softball, cross country (boys/girls), soccer (boys/girls), cheer, and track and field (boys/girls).
 
Quiz Bowl
The senior high quiz bowl team has won five state championships.
 
EAST
The EAST chapter was the recipient of the 2009 Founder's Award, which is given annually to the EAST chapter that best exemplifies the vision of founder Tim Stephenson.

References

External links 
 

Public high schools in Arkansas
Schools in Clark County, Arkansas